Thomas Barker Ferguson was a diplomat from the United States, most notable for serving as United States Ambassador to Sweden from 1894 to 1898.

References

1841 births
1922 deaths
19th-century American diplomats
Ambassadors of the United States to Sweden
Confederate States Army officers
Military personnel from Charleston, South Carolina
People of South Carolina in the American Civil War
Politicians from Charleston, South Carolina
The Citadel, The Military College of South Carolina alumni